Roberts Uldriķis (born 3 April 1998) is a Latvian professional footballer who plays as a forward for Eredivisie club SC Cambuur and the Latvia national football team.

International career
Uldriķis made his Latvia national football team debut on 12 June 2017 in a friendly game against Estonia.

International goals
Scores and results list Latvia's goal tally first.

References

External links
 Career stats - Voetbal International
 

Living people
1998 births
Footballers from Riga
Association football forwards
Latvian footballers
Latvia youth international footballers
Latvia under-21 international footballers
Latvia international footballers
FS METTA/Latvijas Universitāte players
FK RFS players
FC Sion players
SC Cambuur players
Latvian Higher League players
Swiss Super League players
Eredivisie players
Latvian expatriate footballers
Expatriate footballers in Switzerland
Latvian expatriate sportspeople in Switzerland
Expatriate footballers in the Netherlands
Latvian expatriate sportspeople in the Netherlands